Knaj  is a hamlet of Drogomyśl in the administrative district of Gmina Strumień, within Cieszyn County, Silesian Voivodeship, in southern Poland.

The settlement originated as a folwark (German: vorwerk), mentioned in 1722 as zum vorwerg Knay. It lies on the Knajka stream and on the southern outskirts of Kniejski Las (lit. Knaj's Forest). All this names are derived from a word knieja denoting a wild, dense forest. In 1735 Knaj was adjoined to a Catholic parish in Pruchna. Later it became a part of the modern municipality of Drogomyśl.

References

Villages in Cieszyn County
Cieszyn Silesia